Seán Ó Cionnaith (born July 1938 near Ballinasloe, County Galway, died 16 February 2003 in Dublin) was an Irish socialist republican politician, and a prominent member of the Workers' Party.

Ó Cionnaith joined the Irish republican movement as a teenager, and in the late 1950s he became an activist with Na Fianna Éireann, the movement's youth section. He spent some periods of work in England as organizer for Clann na hÉireann, but eventually based himself in Dublin where he continued as a member of Sinn Féin.

Ó Cionnaith was a supporter of the efforts to move Sinn Féin into a more socialist position and was a close confidant of figures such as IRA Chief of Staff Cathal Goulding, along with Seán Garland and Tomás Mac Giolla. He strongly opposed the emergence of the Provisional Irish Republican Army, regarding its campaign as sectarian.

During the 1960s and early 1970s, Ó Cionnaith developed a number of campaigning organisations including the Dublin Housing Action Committee, the Gaeltacht Civil Rights Movement (Coiste Cearta Síbialta na Gaeilge), the Resources Protection Campaign and the campaign to end the control by private landlords over the fishing rights to Irish rivers and lakes.

He identified with the socialist cause and its internationalist outlook, and was involved in many solidarity campaigns with Cuba, Korea, Nicaragua and Vietnam.

In the 1970s he became joint General Secretary of Official Sinn Féin (later Sinn Féin the Workers' Party and ultimately the Workers' Party) along with Máirín de Burca.

Ó Cionnaith served as Director of International Affairs of the Workers' Party for years, and was the party's representative in the United States during the early 1970s.

He remained with the Workers' Party after the split that led to the formation of Democratic Left.

Ó Cionnaith was co-opted as a member of Dublin City Council in the mid-1990s. Most notable was his leading role in the campaign for the replacement of dangerous and unreliable lifts in the Ballymun high-rise complex, which saw the local community win a landmark court case against the local authority. He lost his council seat in 1999, and was unsuccessful when he stood in Dublin North-West at the 2002 general election.

On 15 February 2003, Ó Cionnaith joined over 100,000 Irish people who participated in a major march in Dublin against the impending US/UK-led invasion of Iraq. He died suddenly early the following morning.

References 

1938 births
2003 deaths
Workers' Party (Ireland) politicians
Politicians from County Galway